Saint-Roch-de-Richelieu is a municipality located in the Pierre-De Saurel Regional County Municipality of Quebec (Canada), in the administrative region of Montérégie. The population as of the Canada 2021 Census was 2,573.

Demographics

Population
Population trend:

Language
Mother tongue language (2021)

See also
List of municipalities in Quebec

References

External links
Municipal government Web site

Municipalities in Quebec
Incorporated places in Pierre-De Saurel Regional County Municipality